Kailash Nath Sonkar is an Indian politician who served as a Member of the Uttar Pradesh Legislative Assembly from Ajagara since 2017 to 2022 representing the Suheldev Bharatiya Samaj Party.

References 

Living people
People from Chandauli district
Uttar Pradesh MLAs 2017–2022
Suheldev Bhartiya Samaj Party politicians
Year of birth missing (living people)